Autodesk Maya, commonly shortened to just Maya, is a 3D computer graphics application that runs on Windows, macOS and Linux, originally developed by Alias and currently owned and developed by Autodesk. It is used to create assets for interactive 3D applications (including video games), animated films, TV series, and visual effects.

History
Maya was originally an animation product based on code from The Advanced Visualizer by Wavefront Technologies, Thomson Digital Image (TDI) Explore, PowerAnimator by Alias, and Alias Sketch!. The IRIX-based projects were combined and animation features were added; the project codename was Maya. Walt Disney Feature Animation collaborated closely with Maya's development during its production of Dinosaur. Disney requested that the user interface of the application be customizable so that a personalized workflow could be created. This was a particular influence in the open architecture of Maya, and partly responsible for it becoming popular in the animation industry.

After Silicon Graphics Inc. acquired both Alias and Wavefront Technologies, Inc., Wavefront's technology (then under development) was merged into Maya. SGI's acquisition was a response to Microsoft Corporation acquiring Softimage 3D. The new wholly owned subsidiary was named "AliasWavefront".

In the early days of development Maya started with Tcl as the scripting language, in order to leverage its similarity to a Unix shell language, but after the merger with Wavefront it was replaced with Maya Embedded Language (MEL). Sophia, the scripting language in Wavefront's Dynamation, was chosen as the basis of MEL.

Maya 1.0 was released in February 1998. Following a series of acquisitions, Maya was bought by Autodesk in 2005. Under the name of the new parent company, Maya was renamed Autodesk Maya. However, the name "Maya" continues to be the dominant name used for the product.

Overview
Maya is an application used to generate 3D assets for use in film, television, games, and commercials. The software was initially released for the IRIX operating system. However, this support was discontinued in August 2006 after the release of version 6.5. Maya was available in both "Complete" and "Unlimited" editions until August 2008, when it was turned into a single suite.

Users define a virtual workspace (scene) to implement and edit media of a particular project. Scenes can be saved in a variety of formats, the default being .mb (Maya D). Maya exposes a node graph architecture. Scene elements are node-based, each node having its own attributes and customization. As a result, the visual representation of a scene is based entirely on a network of interconnecting nodes, depending on each other's information. For the convenience of viewing these networks, there is a dependency and a directed acyclic graph.

Nowadays, the 3D models can be imported to game engines such as Unreal Engine and Unity.

Industry usage
The widespread use of Maya in the film industry is usually associated with its development on the film Dinosaur, released by Disney and The Secret Lab on May 19, 2000. In 2003, when the company received an Academy Award for Technical Achievement, it was noted to be used in films such as The Lord of the Rings: The Two Towers, Spider-Man (2002), Ice Age, and Star Wars: Episode II – Attack of the Clones. By 2015, VentureBeat Magazine stated that all ten films in consideration for the Best Visual Effects Academy Award had used Autodesk Maya and that it had been "used on every winning film since 1997."

Awards
On March 1, 2003, Alias was given an Academy Award for Technical Achievement by the Academy of Motion Picture Arts and Sciences for scientific and technical achievement for their development of Maya software.

In 2005, while working for Alias|Wavefront, Jos Stam shared an Academy Award for Technical Achievement with Edwin Catmull and Tony DeRose for their invention and application of subdivision surfaces.

On February 8, 2008, Duncan Brinsmead, Jos Stam, Julia Pakalns and Martin Werner received an Academy Award for Technical Achievement for the design and implementation of the Maya Fluid Effects system.

See also

References

External links

 

1998 software
Autodesk products
3D graphics software
Computer-aided design software
3D animation software
3D graphics software that uses Qt
Software that uses Qt
IRIX software
3D computer graphics software for Linux
Proprietary software that uses Qt
Proprietary commercial software for Linux